The Neftçi 2021–22 season is Neftçi's 31st Azerbaijan Premier League season. Neftchi will compete in the Azerbaijan Premier League, the Azerbaijan Cup and the UEFA Europa Conference League.

Season events
On 23 June, Neftçi announced the signing of Ataa Jaber to a two-year contract, from Ashdod. The following day, 24 June, Neftçi announced the signing of Godsway Donyoh to a two-year contract, from Maccabi Haifa.

On 1 July, Neftçi announced the signing of Kenny Saief to a two-year contract from Anderlecht.

On 4 July, Neftçi announced the signing of Solomon Kvirkvelia from Gagra to a two-year contract.

On 20 July, Neftçi announced the signing of Yegor Bogomolsky to a three-year contract from Minsk.

On 8 August, Neftçi announced the signing of Vato Arveladze to a one-year contract, with the option of a second, from Fatih Karagümrük.

On 9 January, Neftçi announced the signing of Hojjat Haghverdi to an 18-month contract from Sumgayit.

On 19 January, Neftçi announced the signing of Keelan Lebon to an 18-month contract from Astana.

On 23 January, Neftçi announced that they had sold Godsway Donyoh to Apollon Limassol.

On 26 January, Neftçi announced the year-long loan signing of Saldanha from JEF United Chiba.

On 28 January, Yusuf Lawal left Neftçi to sign for Arouca.

On 15 February, Guilherme Pato left Neftçi by mutual agreement.

Squad

Transfers

In

Loans in

Out

Loans out

Released

Friendlies

Competitions

Overview

Premier League

Results summary

Results by round

Results

League table

Azerbaijan Cup

UEFA Europa Conference League

Qualifying phase

Squad statistics

Appearances and goals

|-
|colspan="14"|Players away on loan:

|-
|colspan="14"|Players who left Neftçi during the season:

|}

Goal scorers

Clean sheets

Disciplinary record

References

External links 

Neftçi PFK seasons
Azerbaijani football clubs 2022–23 season
Neftchi